Robert I or Rupert (697 – 758), was a count in the Hesbaye region and Duke of Neustria. His father's name is known to be Lambert. He was a count palatine under Childeric III.

Robert married Williswinda, daughter of Adalhelm, Grundherr im Wormsgau.  Robert and Williswinda had three children:
 Cancor (d. 771), Count of Hesbaye and Rheingau
 Anselm (killed in battle in Roncesvalles, Spain, 778), Count Palatine
 Thuringbert

Upon his death in 758, Robert was succeeded as count by his brother-in-law Signramnus, probably prior to his son Cancor coming of age.

Primary sources

In a charter of 741/2 which exists in several versions, wherein a Robert, son of Lambert, Count or Duke of the "pago Hasbaniensi et Masuarinsi", the land of Hasbanians and Masuarians, granted lands near Diest to Sint-Truiden Abbey. 

The third continuation of the Gesta Abbatum Trudonensium, in its report of the charter, describes Robert as Robertus comes vel dux Hasbanie ("count or Duke of Hasbania").

This Robert, the Gesta says, is also the one mentioned as a Duke in the medieval biography (Vita) of Bishop Eucherius of Orléans. When Charles Martel exiled Eucherius to Cologne this was under the custody of the said Duke Robert of Hasbania (Hasbanio Chrodoberto duce).

The connection to Williswinda has been proposed by some historians because her late husband had the name Robert, as is mentioned only once in the Necrology of Lorsch abbey.

References

Sources 

697 births
748 deaths
Counts of Hesbaye